is a Prefectural Natural Park in central Nagano Prefecture, Japan. Two separate areas of the park span the borders of the municipalities of Chikuhoku, Chikuma, Ikusaka, Nagano, and Omi.

See also
 National Parks of Japan

References

External links
  Map of the parks of Nagano Prefecture

Parks and gardens in Nagano Prefecture
Protected areas established in 1965
1965 establishments in Japan
Chikuhoku, Nagano
Chikuma, Nagano
Ikusaka, Nagano
Nagano (city)
Omi, Nagano